The Battle of Cahul occurred on 1 August 1770 (21 July 1770 in Julian Calendar) during the Russo-Turkish War of 1768–1774. It was the decisive and most important land battle of the war and one of the largest battles of the 18th century. It was fought in Moldavia, near the village of Frumoasa (now Cahul, Moldova), nearly a month after the Russian victory at Larga.

While the army of the Ottomans and its Crimean Tatar vassals greatly outnumbered the Russian force opposite them, the Russian commander, Field Marshal Pyotr Rumyantsev, deftly arranged his far smaller army in solid infantry squares and surprisingly chose to go on the offensive against the allied forces. Assisting it is the superb coordination and firing rapidity of the Russian artillery, which effectively neutralized the Ottoman artillery and largely negated the numerical superiority of the Ottoman army. The result was a decisive Russian victory.

Background 
The Russian empress Catherine II ordered the invasion of Moldavia and Wallachia, both of which states under Ottoman suzerainty, in September 1769 as a response to the Ottoman sultan Mustafa III's declaration of war against Russia the previous year. Leading the invasion endeavor was Field Marshal Pyotr Rumyantsev. Although the Ottoman forces, joined by Crimean Tatar forces from the east, had greater numerical superiority over the Russian forces, it was evident that they were buckling under the speed and shock of the Russian invasion, retreating after suffering losses from battles and sieges while their fortresses were falling one by one. The Ottoman sultan did not expect such a calamity to happen, but this shocked the Grand Vizier Ivazzade Halil Pasha even more that he had lost oversight of the overall situation in the theater and thus let the initiative pass to the enemy for the time being. To make matters worse, after the battle at Larga, the Ottomans and Crimean Tatars retreated in two different and distant directions which made assistance to each other for the next battle nearly impossible: the Tatars retreated to the direction of Izmail and Kiliya, while the Ottomans retreated towards the village of Frumoasa, now called Cahul, near the Kagul River.

Despite losing the engagement at Larga and the fact that nearly all of Wallachia and Bessarabia was in Russian hands, Ivazzade Halil Pasha believed that retaking the initiative from the Russians was still possible. It only helped convince him such when the Crimean khan Qaplan II Giray sent him Russian prisoners whom the Ottomans thoroughly interrogated. The Grand Vizier found out that the smaller Russian army was nearing the end of its campaign capability, with its food supplies and ammunition stocks nearing depletion. It was then he decided that he had to order a grand counterattack against the Russian force forcing its way across the riverine region of southeastern Moldavia. At that end, the Grand Vizier rushed back to the Ottoman capital Constantinople to discuss matters with the Sultan and other Ottoman commanders involved, thus starting an emergency council of war which lasted several days. After some time in preparation and deliberation, the Grand Vizier returned to the theater and managed to reinforce his army, which had been gravely depleted after several crushing battlefield defeats. He gathered a sizeable army consisting of 150,000 men-at-arms gathered from all parts of the empire at his disposal by mid-July, many of whom were ferried by 300 ships from across the Danube River.

Prelude 
After assigning the subordinates to their respective positions, the Ottoman Grand Vizier Ivazzade Halil Pasha promised to the army that there would be no defeat by the Russians this time, and likewise the army and their commanders responded that there would be no backing down on the effort at winning the battle no matter the cost. With the reinforced and rebuilt Crimean Tatar army of 80,000 cavalry only  from his position, he was confident of total victory against the smaller Russian army marching towards his army nearby.

Meanwhile, despite numerous victories in the field, Field Marshal Rumyantsev became cautious as the Ottoman army built up its numbers, dangerously outnumbering his own Russian force. Moreover, the terrain was advantageous to the Ottomans since although the battlefield was marked by the river to the west and numerous small lakes and marshes to the east which limited the mobility of the Russian army, it also contained two valleys which allowed the numerous Ottoman cavalry to attack the Russian rear. Therefore, he decided that he had to march rapidly towards the main Ottoman army to prevent them from uniting with the Crimean Tatar force nearby and force a battle with the former immediately lest the situation for him and the Russian army worsens. Although the Ottoman army was undoubtedly the far larger and better equipped one compared to the medieval-style Crimean Tatar force, it was also the nearest for the Russians within the nearest marching distance to engage as to not aggravate the already worsening supply situation which he tried so hard to resolve by issuing 10-days worth of thriftily chosen rations to each soldier after resupplying shortly after the Larga battle, therefore neglecting his own supply lines but at the same time providing provisional sustenance to his men up into the coming battle.

Battle 

The Russian force arrived on a location on the right bank of the river and thus encamped by 31 July (20 July on Russian calendar). Ivazzade Pasha witnessed the marching of this force, and after doing a reconnaissance on the Russian positions, decided that he launch his attack on the next day at precisely 10 a.m., two hours nearing noon time. But this plan was already hours late compared to Rumyantsev's plan: the Russian force is to launch its offensive the Kagul River by 1 a.m. — only an hour after midnight, with 17,000 infantrymen deployed in squares with sharpshooters defending their flanks as they have to fight their way against superior numbers of the enemy especially their cavalry, while the rest have to be put in reserve in case things went out of his plan. With this chronological discrepancy in the plans of commanders of both sides, the Russians are sure to achieve the element of surprise against the enemy the moment it launches its attack.

When the Ottomans, still on the midst of their preparation on their albeit-late offensive that is not to take place, saw the Russian force on infantry squares marching towards them early in the morning, they commenced a grand yet disorganized cavalry charge all across the entire length of the battle line. But the Russians backed their infantry squares with light artillery inside the squares which only fired when the soldiers opened lanes to make way for its line of fire. The said cannons fired grapeshots to the Ottoman cavalry, inflicting seriously crippling losses to the attackers and were thus driven back with only relatively few remaining to report to their commanders, and thus the Russians continued their fighting march. The Ottomans then tried to flank the Russian force to the rear, but Rumyantsev hurried his reserves to go towards the entrenchments situated between the marching Russian soldiers and the Ottoman camp thus redirecting the attention of the enemy flanking force on his rear. Fearing to lose his line of retreat, Ivazzade Pasha rushed all available Ottoman units to the entrenchments, only to be torn apart and driven out by constant, devastating and accurate fire of the Russian artillery.

As the Russian forces finally arrived and stormed its way to the Ottoman camp by 8 a.m., they finally felt the sheer weight of the massive Ottoman numbers, with huge throngs of Janissaries trying to inch its way to the gaps in the infantry squares thereby seriously jeopardizing Rumyantsev's attack. But when the massed battery line commanded by Pyotr Melissino, General of the Artillery, opened fire in a massive barrage, the Ottoman forces began taking even more casualties and thus were forced back while demoralized. Thus began the retreat that Ivazzade Pasha could not manage to stop, even going as far as evoking the names of Prophet Muhammad and the present Sultan to implore his troops only to fail, as the retreating Ottomans complained of the devastating Russian firepower as if it was striking like lightning. The routing Ottomans went through a detachment of Anatolian Kurdish cavalrymen supposedly on its way to assist Ivazzade Pasha, but the detachment instead looted whatever belongings the soldiers on flight carried with them, therefore adding to the chaos the Ottoman army was already in. He had no choice but to join along with whatever was left of his staff in the disorganized retreat.

Conclusion 
The tragedy of the unfortunate Ottoman force did not end at the disaster at Kagul. The next day in 2 August, Rumyantsev sent a corps to chase the retreating Ottoman army on its way to board the 300 ships at the Danube River ready to take the army home. The Russian corps eventually caught up with the already broken enemy force, initiating yet another engagement in which the Russians yet again inflicted heavy losses on the Ottomans and effectively dispersed and scattered what was left of their army which were now fleeing in all directions except north with many trying to swim across the Danube to escape the Russian onslaught only to die drowning, managing to capture the entire 300-ship Ottoman convoy and 30 cannons, therefore completing the Ottoman defeat and the Russian triumph at Kagul.

In total, the Ottoman army suffered more than 20,000 killed, wounded, and missing or taken prisoner strewn along the battlefield of Kagul and along a -trail from the battlefield to the Danube. The Russian army suffered far fewer losses, at about 1,000 killed and wounded. The Russians also managed to capture all off the Ottoman army's artillery pieces, 130 guns in total including the 30 guns captured near the northern Danube riverbank. 

Hearing of the disaster at the Kagul River, the Crimean khan Qaplan II Giray entered the city of Izmail out of fear of facing the smaller yet seemingly unstoppable Russian force, but the locals of the city were wary of the Tatars' presence in the city, owing to their fear that the invading Russians would give them reprisals for allowing the Tatars to enter their city. The huge yet disheartened Tatar army along with the Crimean Khan, having not participated in the battle at Kagul the previous day despite only an hour's march away, instead retreated towards Ackerman located on the Crimean homeland, having accomplished nothing positive thus far and giving zero contribution on the Ottoman war effort for the rest of the war.

Aftermath 
In the wake of the victory at Kagul, with the Ottoman military presence in the Danube Delta region rendered null, the Russians overran all major fortresses in the region — Izmail, Kiliya, Ackerman (now Bilhorod-Dnistrovskyi), İbrail (now Brăila), İsakça (now Isaccea), and Bender, all taken with minor difficulties.

In commemoration of the victory, the empress Catherine II ordered the Cahul Obelisk to be erected in Tsarskoe Selo, while Frederick II of Prussia sent to Rumyantsev a congratulatory letter in which he compared the Russian victory to the deeds of the Ancient Romans. Meanwhile, the Ottoman sultan Mustafa III removed Ivazzade Halil Pasha from his post as the Grand Vizier as a result of this defeat and was replaced by Silahdar Mehmed Pasha.

On the same day four years later, Russian and Ottoman empires signed the Treaty of Küçük Kaynarca, ending the war.

Sources

Kagul
Kagul
Kagul
Cahul
1770 in Europe
1770 in the Ottoman Empire
Russo-Turkish War (1768–1774)